Caloptilia porphyracma is a moth of the family Gracillariidae. It is known from Punjab, India.

References

porphyracma
Moths of Asia
Moths described in 1922